"I'm a Slave 4 U" is a song recorded by American singer Britney Spears for her third studio album, Britney (2001). Written and produced by Chad Hugo and Pharrell Williams of the Neptunes, it was released on September 25, 2001, by Jive Records as the lead single from the album. Marking a transition for Spears from the teen pop sounds of her previous singles, "I'm a Slave 4 U" is a dance-pop track with urban pop and R&B influences. The lyrics describes the plea of a young woman to be liberated and feel independent.

Heralding a new, provocative image for Spears, "I'm a Slave 4 U" garnered a mixed reception from music critics at the time of its release. Some argued it was the singer's most mature sound at the time, compared to her previous singles, while others noticed the song's attempt to leave behind Spears' girl next door image and said her vocals were unnatural. The song achieved commercial success worldwide, peaking within the top ten in almost every country that it charted in. However, the song peaked only at number 27 on the US Billboard Hot 100 and number 85 on the Hot R&B/Hip-Hop Songs, both being the lowest chart positions of the single worldwide.

Since its release, "I'm a Slave 4 U" has become one of Spears' signature hits as well as one of the defining songs of the 2000s and of the genre. Spears' 2001 MTV Video Music Awards performance of the song is considered amongst the greatest live performances in pop music history, as well as a career highlight for Spears. MTV summarized Spears' performance at the ceremony, saying, "draping herself in a Albino python and slithering around a steamy garden setting – surrounded by dancers in zebra and tiger outfits – Spears created one of the most striking visuals in the 27-year history of the show." In 2021, Billboard ranked "I'm a Slave 4 U" at number three in its list of "The 100 Greatest Songs of 2001".

Background and composition

"I'm a Slave 4 U" was written and produced by Pharrell Williams and Chad Hugo of the Neptunes, who also collaborated with Spears on "Boys", another track from Britney. Both recordings were originally intended for Janet Jackson's seventh studio album All for You (2001) – Jackson's recording was an unreleased demo before the track was handed to Spears. "I'm a Slave 4 U" was recorded by Andrew Cleman (Master Sound Studios, Virginia Beach, Virginia) and Brian Garten (Right Track Studios, New York City), and was mixed by Serban Ghenea. Audio engineering on the track was done by Ryan Smith and Tim Roberts. After reading the lyrics for the first time, Spears stated it talks "...about me just wanting to go out and forget who I am and dance and have a good time. That's kinda where I am right now. I love working, but at the same time I love having a good time."

The dance-pop and R&B song is backed with breathy and moaning vocals and scratching. The soundscape of the song has been noted to be similar to Vanity 6's 1982 song "Nasty Girl".

Critical reception

Ted Kessler from NME magazine stated that "...the song is funk the way God intended—hypnotic, insistent, mysterious, suggestive—and if Prince was a nineteen-year-old former Disney Club host and virgin, he'd be proud to create such a record." Stephen Thomas Erlewine of AllMusic agreed that "I'm a Slave 4 U" was a step towards a more mature sound. According to Rolling Stones Barry Walters, "...although they're not the album's most melodious cuts, the Neptunes' 'I'm a Slave 4 U' and 'Boys' could be Britney's most important." Bill Lamb from About.com listed the track at number nine on her Top 10 Songs, saying: "By the time of this single off her third album, it was obvious Britney Spears was becoming an adult. This song is a radical shift from the "not quite innocent" 16-year-old schoolgirl of Britney's first album. Slinky and sexy have crept into the Britney Spears style".

"I'm a Slave 4 U" received several comparisons to Janet Jackson's songs, with one critic noting, "Spears' main musical and visual influence has not been Madonna but Janet Jackson." "But Jackson's not the only influence to appear on 'Slave': ...The Neptunes' minimal, electronic production and Spears' breathy, cooing delivery create a track that smacks of Prince." "Spears, on the other hand, became more and more interesting – and enjoyable – as she continued to explore elements of Janet Jackson and Prince throughout her career." Lyndsey Parker of Yahoo! Music wrote, "'Slave', written and produced by the Neptunes and originally intended for OG pop bombshell Janet Jackson, evoked the old-school sexcapades of Prince and his protégés Vanity 6—and in many ways, it was a real artistic leap."

Chart performance
"I'm a Slave 4 U" peaked at number 27 on the Billboard Hot 100 for the issue date of December 1, 2001, becoming Spears' first lead single from an album not to crack the U.S. top ten. The track also became a top 30 hit on the Hot 100 Airplay, but just barely made into the Hot 100 Singles Sales, peaking at number 73. The low sales points were mostly due to the song's 12-inch single release instead of a competitive regular CD single. Despite the low sales, "I'm a Slave 4 U" became Spears' first dance hit, reaching number four on the Hot Dance Club Play chart. It is also her first and, so far, only song to appear on the Hot R&B/Hip-Hop Songs chart, peaking at number 85. In Europe, "I'm a Slave 4 U" was more successful, becoming a top ten hit in nearly every country that it charted in – in big markets such as Germany and France, it was certified silver by the Syndicat National de l'Édition Phonographique for selling over 125,000 copies. The track spent two weeks at number five on the European Hot 100 Singles chart provided by magazine Music and Media at the time. "I'm a Slave 4 U" peaked at number four on the UK Singles Chart and spent a total of 14 weeks within the top 75 and sold over 150,000 copies. In the Pacific, the track was somewhat successful, debuting at number seven on the Australian Singles Chart. Despite spending only eight weeks on the chart, it was certified gold by the Australian Recording Industry Association for shipments of over 35,000 units. In New Zealand, "I'm a Slave 4 U" debuted at number 46 on November 4, 2001, and missed the top ten, peaking at number 13 in its third week. The song spent only six weeks on the chart.

Music video

The accompanying music video for "I'm a Slave 4 U" was filmed on a soundstage in Universal City, California, over Labor Day weekend on September 1–2, 2001, under the direction of Francis Lawrence. It made its world premiere on MTV's Making the Video on September 24 at 5 p.m. EST, the same day the song officially beat the US radio stations. It was choreographed by Wade Robson and Brian Friedman. Spears told MTV that the theme of the song and the video really matched who she was at the time. Director Lawrence wanted the video to move far beyond the "sleek" dance clubs of Los Angeles or New York. He wanted it to go global: "I came up with this concept of having this club be in this abandoned Asian bath house and having it be filled with young world travelers, the kind of people who would go to these far exotic places to go to a place like this".

In the video, Spears and her backup dancers employ the same choreography and sing while looking over a balcony at cars down in the distance. Spears is portrayed as a slave to the music, dancing all day until she and the backup dancers are sweaty and near dehydration, forcing them to search for water — Spears is then seen standing by a mirror at the sink. Two alternative versions of the video clip can be found on the Greatest Hits: My Prerogative DVD released on November 9, 2004. The music video was nominated in three categories at the 2002 MTV Video Music Awards for Best Female Video, Best Dance Video, and Best Choreography. The video clip for "I'm a Slave 4 U" was noted for drawing inspiration from Janet Jackson, with one review saying "Spears' main musical and visual influence has not been Madonna but Janet Jackson, particularly in her visual element. The Jackson influence can be seen in the video for 'I'm a Slave 4 U', and it continues through 'Me Against the Music,' 'Boys,' and 'My Prerogative,' as well as her live performances in general." In Canada, the video ranked number one in the list of the "50 Sexiest Music Videos of All-Time" published by music video channel MuchMusic in 2007. Ten years later, the video would be compared to her "Till the World Ends" music video. Several references from the "I'm a Slave 4 U" video were made in the video for "Till the World Ends", such as the dancers crowding around her and the sweaty dancers scene.

Live performances

Spears first performed "I'm a Slave 4 U" at the 2001 MTV Video Music Awards at the Metropolitan Opera House in New York City on September 6, 2001. The performance is widely considered amongst the greatest moments in the award show's history as well as in pop culture. The performance featured a white tiger (wrangled by Bhagavan Antle) and a live amelanistic Burmese python on her shoulders. Other performances include several television appearances to promote her third album, Britney. She performed on The Tonight Show with Jay Leno on October 11, and a special named Total Britney Live was aired by MTV on November 3, where Spears performed "I'm a Slave 4 U", "Stronger", and "I'm Not a Girl, Not Yet a Woman". Two days later, on November 5, Spears performed "I'm a Slave 4 U" on The Rosie O'Donnell Show, and on the Late Show with David Letterman the day after. A month later, she opened the 2001 Billboard Music Awards in Las Vegas on December 4, 2001, with a performance of the track on a stage inside the fountains of the Bellagio Hotel.

Spears performed the song on the 2001–02 Dream Within a Dream Tour, in a setting resembling the performance at the MTV Video Music Awards. According to Jim Farber from New York Daily News, "But for all the bumping and grinding that went on, parents had no reason to cover their daughters' eyes". To promote her fourth studio album In the Zone, she performed the track at the 2003 NFL Kickoff Live on September 4, 2003, at the National Mall. Other songs performed included "Me Against the Music" and "...Baby One More Time". On September 14, Spears played a surprise concert at Rain Nightclub in the Palms Casino Resort, and performed the aforementioned songs along with a new song titled "Breathe on Me". On November 17, a concert special titled Britney Spears: In the Zone aired on ABC, and included a mash-up of "I'm a Slave 4 U" and "Boys". On The Onyx Hotel Tour in 2004, the track was included on the setlist and had a "Flintstones-meets-Survivor" set.

"I'm a Slave 4 U" was performed as a shortened version on the 2007 The M+M's Tour. On The Circus Starring Britney Spears in 2009, Spears performed the song in a setting "complete with flames and a fierce dance routine", which managed to "rise above all the ephemera" according to MTV News' James Montgomery. For the Femme Fatale Tour in 2011, "I'm a Slave 4 U" was performed as fetishistic shots of naked, bound men were displayed on the backdrops. On her residency concert in Las Vegas, Britney: Piece of Me (2013–17), Spears initially started the performance sat on a throne surrounded by her female dancers who are playing in a fountain. Later on, the throne was removed in favor of a pole. At the 2016 Billboard Music Awards, the song was once again on a stripper pole as part of a greatest hits medley. While promoting her ninth studio album Glory in 2016, Spears performed the song at several music festivals worldwide, including the iHeartRadio Music Festival, Apple Music Festival, KIIS-FM Jingle Ball, and the 99.7's Triple Ho Show. "I'm a Slave 4 U" was performed on the 2017 Britney: Live in Concert Asian tour, as well as on the Piece of Me Tour in 2018, which covered North America and Europe.

According to rehearsal videos published at Spears's social media accounts in late 2018, "I'm a Slave 4 U" was set to be performed at her planned residency Britney: Domination prior to its cancellation.

Cover versions
"I'm a Slave 4 U" was covered by the musical television show Glee in the episode "Britney/Brittany", sung by Heather Morris in her singing debut. In a dream sequence, Morris' character Brittany Pierce sings the song, while recreating several iconic looks from Spears' videos: the red catsuit from "Oops!... I Did It Again", the outfit with a snake from Spears' 2001 performance at the VMAs, and the white diamond bodysuit from "Toxic". Morris also performed the song during the live 2011 Glee Tour. In 2015, Brazilian singers Anitta and Lorena Simpson performed the song at Anitta's special concert at Chá da Alice when the singer reproduced the original choreography and also sported a white python on stage.

Legacy and influence

"I'm a Slave 4 U" was widely seen as being a departure from Spears' girl next door image and signature bubblegum pop sound from her previous two albums ...Baby One More Time and Oops!... I Did It Again – the sound of the single leans more towards "urban pop" and R&B, and the accompanying video and live performances are more overtly sexual. Upon its release, the song and video - as well as Spears' performance at the 2001 MTV Video Music Awards - were heavily criticized for their overt sexual nature as well as for Spears only being 19 years old at the time and a self-proclaimed virgin. Many critics at the time compared the song and its video to that of Prince and Janet Jackson. Some critics also noted similarities in Spears' slight transition from bubblegum pop and more confident overt sexuality to that of Madonna in the early 1990s, during which she was transitioning from her pop sound of the 1980s to a more mature sound and more explicit sexuality on her single and music video for "Justify My Love" and on her Erotica album.

"I'm a Slave 4 U" was seen as so controversial upon its release that Spears received immense backlash from The Parents Association of America (PAA), as well as several other conservative outlets. The PAA also urged people to boycott Spears and criticized her for "being an irresponsible and bad role model to young girls all over the country", with even the wife of governor Bob Ehrlich proclaiming at a live press conference, "If I had a chance, I would shoot Britney Spears." Spears responded to the backlash in a December 2001 Rolling Stone article, "I don't see the big deal and I don't see the need for an apology. I'm a 19-year-old girl about to be 20, I'm growing up and there's nothing wrong with that. Besides no matter what, I can never win, when I did '...Baby One More Time' they were saying I was too controversial, so you can never win."

While then seen as controversial, in subsequent years "I'm a Slave 4 U" has since gone down in pop culture history with Billboard regarding the video and song itself as "groundbreaking, daring and artistically creative" in 2013. Many music critics have credited the Britney album as a whole and its lead single "I'm a Slave 4 U" for inspiring other female artists of her own generation and the generation following her. In 2017, writing for Rolling Stone, Peter Travers noted, "In the early 2000s there was no one bigger in music than Britney Spears and with her third studio album Britney and its lead single 'I'm a Slave 4 U', Britney Spears started a new trend. The now clichéd trend of a young girl transitioning from the Disney Channel to a squeaky clean pop image than into overtly sexual 'femme fatale'. From girls of her own era, such as Christina Aguilera and Jessica Simpson, to girls of the next generation, such as Miley Cyrus and Selena Gomez, Spears blazed the trail of how to grow and sustain from Disney kid to pop sensation to pop culture powerhouse."

Miley Cyrus has also cited "I'm a Slave 4 U" for influencing the song and video for her 2013 hit "We Can't Stop". Likewise, Selena Gomez cited the song for influencing her 2013 single "Come & Get it". In a 2010 interview with Vanity Fair, Lindsay Lohan said the song and video for "I'm a Slave 4 U" were the main influence for her 2004 hit "Rumors", with Lohan even using the same director Spears had previously used on her video "My Prerogative". At the 2014 MTV Video Music Awards, Nicki Minaj had planned on paying homage to Spears' 2001 performance for her performance of her song "Anaconda" by using several albino snakes, however, MTV banned Minaj's use of live snakes after a backup dancer was bitten; Minaj's team was also presented with an order from the promotions and management team of R&B singer Beyoncé prohibiting Minaj to pay tribute to Spears since the Video Vanguard Award was supposed to honor Beyoncé throughout the evening. In 2016, Mexican-American singer Becky G paid homage to Spears' 2001 VMA performance by dancing with a yellow snake at Univision's annual awards show Premios Juventud.

In 2021, Billboard named it the third best song of 2001, by noting its impact – "it also blazed a new path for pop stars of the future, letting the world know that how an artist chooses to express themselves is entirely up to them, whether or not you 'like that'."

Track listings

European CD single
 "I'm a Slave 4 U" (Main Version) – 3:23
 "Intimidated" – 3:17

European and Australian CD maxi single
 "I'm a Slave 4 U" (Main Version) – 3:23
 "I'm a Slave 4 U" (Instrumental) – 3:23
 "Intimidated" – 3:17
 "Britney... Interview" – 4:16

Japanese CD maxi single
 "I'm a Slave 4 U" (Main Version) – 3:23
 "I'm a Slave 4 U" (Instrumental) – 3:23
 "Intimidated" – 3:17

UK CD maxi single / cassette single
 "I'm a Slave 4 U" (Main Version) – 3:23
 "Intimidated" – 3:17
 "I'm a Slave 4 U" (Instrumental) – 3:23

12" vinyl
 "I'm a Slave 4 U" (Main Version) – 3:23
 "I'm a Slave 4 U" (Instrumental) – 3:23

12" vinyl (The Remixes)
 "I'm a Slave 4 U" (Thunderpuss Club Mix) – 8:45
 "I'm a Slave 4 U" (Thunderpuss Radio Mix) – 3:18
 "I'm a Slave 4 U" (Miguel Migs Petalpusher Vocal) – 5:30
 "I'm a Slave 4 U" (The Light Remix) – 8:25

Charts

Weekly charts

Year-end charts

Certifications and sales

Release history

References

2001 songs
2001 singles
Britney Spears songs
Jive Records singles
Music videos directed by Francis Lawrence
Oricon International Singles Chart number-one singles
UK Independent Singles Chart number-one singles
Song recordings produced by the Neptunes
Songs written by Pharrell Williams
Songs written by Chad Hugo
Songs about dancing
American contemporary R&B songs
Music videos shot in the United States